São Domingos Futebol Clube, commonly known as São Domingos, was a Brazilian football club based in São Domingos, Sergipe state. They competed in the Copa do Brasil twice.

History
The club was founded on November 11, 2004. São Domingos won the Copa Governador do Estado de Sergipe in 2009, and in 2010. São Domingos faced Sampaio Corrêa in the First Round of the 2010 Copa do Brasil, in the first leg, at Batistão, the game ended in a 1-1 draw. However, in the second leg, played at Estádio Nhozinho Santos, the club was eliminated after being defeated 2-1. They are facing Bahia in the 2011 edition of the Copa do Brasil.

Achievements

 Copa Governador do Estado de Sergipe:
 Winners (2): 2009, 2010

Stadium
São Domingos Futebol Clube played their home games at Estádio Arnaldo Pereira. The stadium has a maximum capacity of 2,000 people.

References

External links
 Official website

Association football clubs established in 2004
Football clubs in Sergipe
2004 establishments in Brazil